The Willows Shopping Center is a shopping center in Concord, California.

History
National retailers at the center include Old Navy, ULTA Beauty, REI, Claim Jumper and Benihana. The center is located adjacent to I-680 that links the area to San Francisco. In addition, two BART stations provide rapid transit.

Anchors
UFC Gym (26,000 sq. ft.) 
Old Navy (20,458 sq. ft.)
REI (29,486 sq. ft.)
ULTA Beauty (10,022 sq. ft.)

External links
 The Willows Shopping Center Official Website

Buildings and structures in Concord, California
Shopping malls in the San Francisco Bay Area
Shopping malls established in 1977
Shopping malls in Contra Costa County, California